is a railway station in the city of Toyoake,  Aichi Prefecture, Japan, operated by Meitetsu.

Lines
Toyoake Station is served by the Meitetsu Nagoya Main Line and is 48.1 kilometers from the terminus of the line at Toyohashi Station.

Station layout
The station has three elevated island platforms connected by a footbridge with the station building underneath. The station has automated ticket machines, Manaca automated turnstiles and is staffed.

Platforms

Adjacent stations

Station history
On 1 April 1935, the Aichi Electric Railway merged with the Nagoya Railroad (the forerunner of present-day Meitetsu). The station was renamed to its present name on 1 September 1956. The station building was reconstructed in 1999.

Passenger statistics
In fiscal 2015, the station was used by an average of 2419 passengers daily. .

Surrounding area
 Japan National Route 1

See also
 List of Railway Stations in Japan

References

External links

 Official web page 

Railway stations in Japan opened in 1925
Railway stations in Aichi Prefecture
Stations of Nagoya Railroad
Toyoake, Aichi